Sambraoghin is a commune in the Baskouré Department of Kouritenga Province in the Centre-Est region of Burkina Faso. It had a population of 1,124 in 2006.

In the 1985 census, one of Sambraoghin's neighbourhoods, Sambraobilin, was listed as a separate settlement with a population of 92.

Demographics

Neighbourhoods

References 

Populated places in the Centre-Est Region